Lure is a commune in the Haute-Saône department in the region of Bourgogne-Franche-Comté in eastern France.

At 8,207 inhabitants (2017), Lure is the third most populous town in the département, smaller than Vesoul and Héricourt, but larger than Luxeuil-les-Bains and Gray.

The Abbey of Lure was situated here.  In the seventh century, Clothaire II recognised the virtues of Saint Deicolus and considerably enriched the Abbey of Lure, also granting Deicolus the manor, woods, fisheries, etc. of the town which had grown around the monastery.

Population

See also
Communes of the Haute-Saône department

References

Communes of Haute-Saône
Subprefectures in France
Irish monastic foundations in continental Europe
Haute-Saône communes articles needing translation from French Wikipedia